Zheng Jianfeng (Chinese: 郑剑锋; pinyin: Zhèng Jiànfēng; born 22 March 1989) is a professional Chinese footballer who currently plays as a defender for Chinese club Dalian LFTZ Huayi.

Club career
Zheng Jianfeng started his career with Dalian Shide and was sent out to their youth team called Dalian Shide Siwu FC who were allowed to take part in Singapore's 2008 S.League. Upon his return to Dalian Shide he would be given his chance to make his debut for the team on July 28, 2010 in a league game against Changchun Yatai that Dalian won 2–1.

He transferred to Qingdao Jonoon in February 2013 after Dalian Shide dissolved.
On 5 January, 2017, Dalian Transcendence signed him by free transfer.

On 28 February 2018, Zheng transferred to Chinese Super League side Dalian Yifang (now known as Dalian Professional).
On 28 February 2019, Zheng was loaned to League Two side Dalian Chanjoy for the 2019 season.

Career statistics 
Statistics accurate as of match played 31 December 2021.

References

External links
Player profile at Sodasoccer.com

1989 births
Living people
Chinese footballers
Footballers from Dalian
Chinese Super League players
China League One players
Liga Portugal 2 players
GS Loures players
Dalian Shide F.C. players
Qingdao Hainiu F.C. (1990) players
Dalian Transcendence F.C. players
Dalian Professional F.C. players
C.D. Aves players
Expatriate footballers in Portugal
Chinese expatriates in Portugal
Association football defenders